Walid Cheddira (born 22 January 1998) is a professional footballer who plays as a forward for  club Bari. Born in Italy, he plays for the Morocco national team.

Club career 
Cheddira spent the first four seasons of his senior career in the lower, non-professional tiers of Italian football.

On 10 July 2019, Cheddira signed a three-year contract with Serie A club Parma, who loaned him to Arezzo in Serie C on 22 July. He made his professional Serie C debut on 25 August, as a starter in a game against Lecco. After half a season, Parma sent Cheddira on loan to Lecco on 31 January 2020, and to Mantova on 4 September.

On 18 July 2021, Cheddira joined Bari on loan, who made the deal permanent on 30 June 2022, signing a contract until June 2025.

International career 
Cheddira was born in Italy and is of Moroccan descent. He was called up to play for the Morocco national team for two friendlies against Chile and Paraguay on 23 and 27 September 2022, respectively; he made his debut against Chile as a second-half substitute in a 2–0 win.

On 10 November 2022, Cheddira was named in Morocco's 26-man squad for the 2022 FIFA World Cup in Qatar. He made his competition debut as an 82nd-minute substitute in the round of 16 against Spain, a penalty shoot-out victory for Morocco following a 0–0 draw after extra time. In the quarter-finals against Portugal, Cheddira came on in the 65th minute, and was sent off for two yellow cards in stoppage time. Morocco won 1–0.

Honours
Bari
 Serie C: 2021–22

Individual
 Serie B Player of the Month: September 2022

References

External links
 

1998 births
Living people
Sportspeople from the Province of Ancona
Footballers from Marche
Moroccan footballers
Morocco international footballers
Italian footballers
Italian people of Moroccan descent
Italian sportspeople of African descent
Association football forwards
A.C. Sangiustese players
Parma Calcio 1913 players
S.S. Arezzo players
Calcio Lecco 1912 players
Mantova 1911 players
S.S.C. Bari players
Serie D players
Serie C players
Serie B players
2022 FIFA World Cup players